Turan Football Club  is a Turkmen football club based in Daşoguz. They play in the top division in Turkmen football, the Turkmenistan Higher League. Their home stadium is Sport Toplumy Stadium. In May 2010, the club changed its name to Daşoguz from Turan Daşoguz by the decision of Turkmenistan Football Federation., at 2016 old name returned.

Achievements
 Turkmenistan Cup: 1
 Winner: 1995
 Finalist: 1994

Performance in AFC competitions
Asian Cup Winners Cup: 2 appearances
1995–96: First Round
1996–97: First Round

References

Football clubs in Turkmenistan